Robert Edward Davies CBE (30 July 1913 – 17 May 2002) was the Anglican Bishop of Tasmania from 1963 to 1981.

Educated at Queensland University, he was ordained in 1937 and began his career as an assistant priest at Christ Church Cathedral, Newcastle, NSW. After World War II service as a chaplain with Toc H and the Royal Australian Air Force he became Warden of St John's College Brisbane. After this he was Archdeacon of Canberra, then Wagga Wagga. He became an assistant bishop of Newcastle and Warden of St John's Theological College, Morpeth in 1960 and three years later the Tasmanian diocesan bishop.

References

1913 births
University of Queensland alumni
Anglican archdeacons in Australia
Assistant bishops in the Anglican Diocese of Newcastle (Australia)
Anglican bishops of Tasmania
Commanders of the Order of the British Empire
2002 deaths
20th-century Anglican bishops in Australia